James Fitzsimmons (November 9, 1870 – October 20, 1948) was a Canadian politician. He served in the Legislative Assembly of British Columbia from 1928 to 1933 from the electoral district of Kaslo-Slocan, a member of the Conservative Party.

References

1870 births
1948 deaths